Maria Chiara Fraschetta (born 2 February 1980), better known by her stage name Nina Zilli, is an Italian singer-songwriter. After releasing her debut single "50mila", she achieved commercial success with the album Sempre lontano, released after participating in the newcomers' section of the Sanremo Music Festival 2010. During the Sanremo Music Festival 2012, Zilli was chosen to represent Italy in the Eurovision Song Contest 2012 in Baku, Azerbaijan, where she placed 9th with the song "L'amore è femmina (Out of Love)", included in her second studio album. Zilli returned to the Sanremo Music Festival in 2015, and competed with the song "Sola" from her upcoming album, Frasi&Fumo. She was also a judge of Italia's Got Talent from 2015 to 2017.

Biography

Childhood and early beginnings
Nina Zilli was born on 2 February 1980 in Piacenza, Italy, to a father from Emilia-Romagna and a mother from Apulia, and grew up in Gossolengo, nine kilometers southwest of Piacenza,

After moving to Ireland, she started performing live and, at the age of thirteen, she started studying opera singing at the conservatory.

In 1997 she founded her first band, The Jerks. After completing high school at the Liceo Scientifico Respighi in Piacenza, she spent two years in the United States, living in Chicago and New York.

TV career and the band Chiara e gli Scuri
Between 2000 and 2001 she co-presented Red Ronnie's TV show Roxy Bar, broadcast in Italy by TMC2. In 2001 she also debuted as a VJ for MTV Italy. Meanwhile she obtained a recording contract with her new band, Chiara e gli Scuri, founded in 2000. In 2001 the band released the single "Tutti al mare". They also started working on an album, but it was never released, due to some disagreements with the recording label.

During the same years, Zilli started her academic studies, later graduating in Public Relations from the IULM University of Milan.

Debut EP Nina Zilli
In 2009, she chose the stage name Nina Zilli, combining her mother's surname with Nina Simone's first name. Zilli released her debut single, "50mila", on 28 July 2009. The song features vocals by Giuliano Palma, though a Nina only version was later included in the soundtrack of Ferzan Özpetek's film Loose Cannons.

Nina Zilli's self-titled debut extended play, Nina Zilli, was released by Universal Music on 11 September 2011. The EP peaked at number 54 on the Italian Albums Chart, and it also spawned the singles "L'inferno", released in September 2009, and "L'amore verrà", an Italian-language cover of The Supremes "You Can't Hurry Love".

Sanremo Music Festival 2010 and Sempre Lontano

On 12 January 2010, it was announced that Nina Zilli was one of the winners of the contest Sanremo New Generation, allowing her to participate in the newcomers section of the 60th Sanremo Music Festival. Zilli's entry, "L'uomo che amava le donne", was performed for the first time on 18 February 2010, and it was admitted to the final, later won by Tony Maiello's "Il linguaggio della resa". During the competition, Zilli received the Critics' Award "Mia Martini" and the Press, Radio & TV Award. The single was certified gold by the Federation of the Italian Music Industry and it was included in Zilli's debut album, Sempre lontano, released on 19 February 2010. A special edition of the album was released on 30 November 2010, together with the single "Bacio d'a(d)dio". On 18 February 2011, the album was certified platinum in Italy, for domestic sales exceeding 60,000 copies.

In February 2011, she received two nominations at the 2011 TRL Awards in the categories Best Look and Italians Do It Better. Zilli was also the presenter of the night, broadcast by MTV Italy on 20 April 2011. In March 2011, Sempre lontano was also released in Spain.

Sanremo Music Festival 2012, L'amore è Femmina and Eurovision Song Contest
In January 2012, Zilli was chosen as one of the participants in the Big Artists section of the 62nd Sanremo Music Festival, performing the song "Per sempre". During the competition, Zilli also performed a cover of Mina's "Grande grande grande", in a duet with British singer Skye Edwards. On the final of the show, she was chosen by a specific jury as the Italian entry to the Eurovision Song Contest 2012.

Zilli's second studio album, L'amore è femmina, was released on 15 February 2012. In March of the same year, she co-presented the show Panariello non esiste, created by Italian comedian Giorgio Panariello and broadcast by Canale 5.

Zilli represented Italy in the Eurovision Song Contest 2012 with the song "L'amore è femmina (Out of Love)". As Italy is one of the "Big Five" who provide the most financial funding into the contest she was automatically allocated in the final. After scoring 101 points, she placed in 9th place.

Italia's Got Talent and Frasi & fumo
In the summer of 2014, it was confirmed that she will be part of Italia's Got Talent jury for its sixth series, aired in 2015 by the pay-TV Sky Uno. Zilli was also confirmed as one of the contestants of the Sanremo Music Festival 2015. She will compete with the song "Sola", which will be included in her third studio album, Frasi & fumo.

Discography

 Sempre lontano (2010)
 L'amore è femmina (2012)
 Frasi & fumo (2015)
 Modern Art (2017)

Awards

Notes

External links

 
 Nina Zilli at Allmusic

1980 births
Living people
People from Piacenza
Italian women singer-songwriters
Italian singer-songwriters
Italian pop singers
Eurovision Song Contest entrants for Italy
Eurovision Song Contest entrants of 2012
21st-century Italian singers
21st-century Italian women singers
IULM University of Milan alumni